U.S. Route 276 (US 276) is a United States highway that runs for  from Mauldin, South Carolina to Cove Creek, North Carolina.  It is known both as a busy urban highway in Greenville, South Carolina and a scenic back-road in Western North Carolina.

Route description
The US Highway then runs north to the City of Greenville, then to Travelers Rest, and then Marietta before climbing into North Carolina.
A two-mile portion of US 276 between Greenville and Travelers Rest is an expressway complete with shoulders, exits, a grass median, and a speed limit of 55 miles per hour.

In Travelers Rest, a Downtown Revitalization Plan has reduced US 276 from four lanes down to two; added trees, on-street parking, a new park, and other improvements.

Between the towns of Brevard and Waynesville in North Carolina, US 276 travels through the Pisgah National Forest and is a route heavily traveled by recreationalists. The road follows the Davidson River and a tributary upstream before climbing the Pisgah Ridge and crossing the Blue Ridge Parkway at its top, then descending by the Pigeon River and the Shining Rock Wilderness. Many trailheads used for hiking, mountain biking, and horseback riding lie along US 276 in this area and roads connecting to it. Drivers will also find roadside campgrounds, picnic areas, waterfalls, and two museums — the Pisgah Center for Wildlife Education and the Cradle of Forestry in America — along the road or within a short distance of it. North of Waynesville, US 276 continues through Lake Junaluska, where it joins US 19 to Maggie Valley, then runs north to I-40 at Cove Creek.

US 276 is signed east–west in South Carolina and north–south in North Carolina; which is why it is listed as having an eastern and northern terminus.

US 276 overlaps with the Forest Heritage Scenic Byway, which is a North Carolina Scenic Byway, National Forest Scenic Byway and National Scenic Byway, that traverses between Pisgah Forest and Woodrow.

History

US 276 was established in 1932, traversing from Laurens, South Carolina to Brevard, North Carolina; it replaced US 76 between Laurens to Greenville, overlapped with US 25 to Travelers Rest, replaced SC 284/NC 284 to Brevard.

Around 1939, US 276 was extended north from Brevard, via Pisgah Forest along the old Pisgah Motor Road, to Waynesville, ending at Main Street. In the 1940s, US 276 was changed to its current routing around the downtown area of Greenville, which established US 276 Business by 1948; the business route would be later replaced by I-85 Business by 1968-70.

In 1957 or 1958, US 276 was moved onto new freeway south of Mauldin to just south of Fountain Inn; its old route was replaced by SC 417 between Mauldin-Simpsonville and SC 14 to Fountain Inn. Between 1959-61, US 276's realignment onto new freeway was complete with a connection with I-26 in Clinton, the remainder of its former route to Laurens was replaced by SC 14.

Also around 1959, US 276 was extended north again to Lake Junaluska, North Carolina, replacing another section of NC 284. By 1968, a widened 4-lane road was completed between Dellwood and Cove Creek, completing a temporary connection between two completed sections of I-40. This section became the final extension north of US 276, replacing the last remaining section NC 284; temporary I-40 lasted till 1974 (when the section between exits 20-27 was completed).

Around 1985, the Mauldin-Clinton freeway was renumbered to I-385; truncating US 276 to its current eastern terminus in Mauldin.

North Carolina Highway 284

NC 284 was a former state highway in the Mountains Region of the state of North Carolina. Its routing through the Great Smoky Mountains was demoted to Old NC 284 (Cove Creek Road) and today remains primitive road; it is thus unpaved and is maintained by the National Park Service. The rest of the old route, which lies to the south, was replaced segment by segment by U.S. Highway 276 from 1939 to 1968, when the last section from Maggie Valley north to the newly constructed Interstate 40 in Cove Creek was replaced by the U.S. highway.

Junction list
Mileposts reset at state line crossings. Highway runs east-west in South Carolina, south-north in North Carloina.

Special routes

Greenville business loop 1

Greenville business loop 2

Travelers Rest connector

U.S. Route 276 Connector (US 276 Conn.) is a  connector route, in concurrency with US 25 Conn., along Poinsett Highway. It connects US 276 with US 25, in downtown Travelers Rest. Not only is the highway unsigned, it is not even shown on SCDOT's Greenville metro area map, so the highway may be decommissioned.

See also

References

External links

NCRoads.com: U.S. 276
Mapmikey's South Carolina Highways Page: US 276

76-2
76-2
76-2
Transportation in Greenville County, South Carolina
Transportation in Transylvania County, North Carolina
Transportation in Haywood County, North Carolina
2